The 2011 FIFA Beach Soccer World Cup was the sixth edition of the FIFA Beach Soccer World Cup, governed by FIFA. Overall, this was the 16th edition of a world cup in beach soccer since the establishment of the Beach Soccer World Championships which ran from 1995–2004 but was not governed by FIFA. It took place at the Stadio del Mare (Stadium of the Sea), a temporary stadium at the Marina di Ravenna in Ravenna, Italy, the third tournament to take place outside Brazil, which started on September 1 and ended on September 11, 2011. However this was the first tournament to take place under the new two year basis; now the FIFA Beach Soccer World Cup takes place once every two years. The tournament was confirmed in March 2010. 

Brazil were the defending champions, after winning their fourth FIFA Beach Soccer World Cup title in 2009. The tournament was won by Russia, winning their first title in their first final after beating Brazil.

Qualifying rounds

African Zone

The African qualifiers took place between June 15 and June 19, 2011, in Casablanca, Morocco, for the first time. The competition took place between nine teams, the same number of teams who competed in the previous championship. Not surprisingly, Senegal and Nigeria were the eventual qualifying nations, after beating Egypt and surprise semi-finalists Madagascar respectively to reach the final. Senegal were the winners of the competition, beating Nigeria 7-4 in the final.

Asian Zone

The Asian qualifiers took place in Muscat, Oman, for the first time, between February 27 and March 4, 2011. Beach Soccer Worldwide and FIFA decided on holding the tournament there, due to the success of the 2010 Asian Beach Games, also held there. A record eleven teams participated, an increase on the previous record of seven teams in 2009. Japan clinched their second successive championship title, after beating hosts Oman in the final who will play at the World Cup for the first time. Iran won the third-place play off against the United Arab Emirates to qualify for their fourth World Cup appearance, whilst the United Arab Emirates have failed to qualify to the World Cup, after hosting the competition in 2009.

European Zone

The European qualifiers took place in Bibione, Italy from 11–18 July 2010, with 27 teams participating for four European berths. The surprising winners of the qualifiers, Ukraine, qualified along with runners-up Portugal, third-place Russia and fourth-place Switzerland. Only the semi-finalists qualified to the World Cup, meaning that Spain, who won the qualifiers in 2008, have failed to make the finals in Ravenna, meaning that this World Cup will be the first time Spain have not competed in twelve World Cups, since 1997. 2005 World Cup winners France have also failed to qualify, making it two World Cups in a row France have failed to qualify for.

North, Central American and Caribbean Zone

The CONCACAF qualifiers were played between 8 nations, an increase from last year's 6, for the first time, between 1–5 December 2010, in Puerto Vallarta, Mexico, for the third year in a row, seeing Jamaica return after four years and newcomers Guatemala joining the tournament. However, inevitably, the qualifiers were fought out between the strongest four nations in CONCACAF: El Salvador, Costa Rica, Mexico and the United States, who met in the semi-finals of the tournament, clearly dominating as a 'big four' force. However, only the finalists could qualify for the World Cup, which led to two dramatic semi-final games which saw both matches go to penalty shootouts. In the end, it was El Salvador and Mexico who qualified, after tense 3-3 and 1-1 draws against Costa Rica and the United States respectively. The qualifying nations eventually went through on penalties, 2-1 and 1-0 respectively, meaning that El Salvador qualify for the World Cup consecutively after putting out Costa Rica, who qualified last year, whilst Mexico qualify after a two-year absence from the World Cup, meaning the United States have now failed to qualify since 2007. Mexico were favourites from CONCACAF in Ravenna after beating El Salvador in the final of the qualifiers. The United States finished third after beating Costa Rica in the third place play off.

Oceanian Zone

The OFC qualifiers took place from 23–26 February 2011 in Papeete, Tahiti, the place where the 2013 FIFA Beach Soccer World Cup will be held. This was the third time the island hosted the qualifiers following 2006 and 2009, but the first in Papeete, as it had been held in Moorea previously. Once again, Fiji, the Solomon Islands, and Tahiti competed however Vanuatu were forced to withdraw due to being stranded at their airport because of a cyclone that had passed through the area. Despite the Solomon Islands looking the dominant team, winning both their games in the group stage, they lost to hosts Tahiti in the final, meaning for the first time since the qualifiers began in 2006, the Solomon Islands will not be competing in the World Cup.

South American Zone

The CONMEBOL qualifiers were originally scheduled to take place from 7–14 May 2011, in Rio de Janeiro, Brazil. However the tournament was rescheduled and took place from 31 July to 7 August. For the fourth consecutive tournament, Brazil won the championship, after beating Argentina in the final, 6-2. Since both these nations reached the final, this also means that they both qualify for the fourth year in a row. The surprise of the tournament saw Uruguay crash out at the group stage of the tournament, meaning for the first time since the World Cup's inception in 1995, Uruguay will not be competing, leaving Brazil as the sole nation to have competed in every World Cup to date. With Uruguay's absence from the knockout stage, this allowed Venezuela to claim victory over surprise semi-finalists Colombia, to qualify for their third World Cup, after their last appearance in 2001.

Hosts
Italy qualified automatically as the hosts, although they still competed in the European qualifiers, being knocked out in the round of 16.

Teams
These are the teams that have qualified for the 2011 FIFA Beach Soccer World Cup:

Asian zone (AFC):

 (first appearance)

African zone (CAF):

European zone (UEFA):
 (hosts)

North, Central American and Caribbean zone (CONCACAF):

Oceanian zone (OFC):
 (first appearance)

South American zone (CONMEBOL):

Venue
Only one venue was used in the city of Ravenna during the World Cup which has been called the Stadio del Mare or the Stadium of the Sea, in English. The Stadium was built as a temporary structure, primarily built to host the World Cup however the stadium also hosted the third stage of the 2011 Euro Beach Soccer League, to promote beach soccer in the area before the start of the World Cup.

Referees
FIFA chose 25 officials to referee the matches. From the 25 referees, at least one referee representing each confederation; four from the AFC, three from CAF, five from CONMEBOL, three from CONCACAF, one from the OFC and eight from UEFA, with all 25 officials being from different countries. The referees were revealed in August 2011.

Final draw
The draw to divide the 16 teams in four groups of four was conducted on 5 July 2011 in Rome, Italy, which was conducted by FIFA Beach Soccer Committee members Joan Cuscó and Jaime Yarza. 1998 FIFA World Cup winner Christian Karembeu and beach soccer legend, Ramiro Figueiras Amarelle assisted the draw.

The sixteen teams were placed into four pots of four teams. One team from each pot was placed into each respective group A, B, C and D, with the hosts being chosen first to play in group A.

Squads

As with previous tournaments, each nations' squad consists of a total of 12 players; only these players were eligible to play in the World Cup. On 25 August 2011, the squad lists for the 16 teams were announced, consisting of a total of 192 players who will be participating in the World Cup. Brazil have the oldest squad, with an average age of 31, whilst Nigeria have the youngest squad with an average age of 22.

Group stage
The group stage commenced on September 1 and concluded on September 6, with Argentina against Oman being the opening match of the competition.

All kickoff times are listed as local time in Ravenna (UTC+2).

Group A

Group B

Group C

Group D

Knockout stage

Quarter finals

Semi finals

Third place play off

Final

Winners

Awards

Top scorers

14 goals
 André

12 goals
 Madjer

9 goals
 Frank Velasquez

8 goals
 Egor Shaykov

7 goals

 Paolo Palmacci
 Egor Eremeev
 Ilya Leonov
 Dmitry Shishin

6 goals

 Victor Tale
 Nuno Belchior
 Pape Koukpaki

5 goals

 Sidney
 Makarov
 Ndiaga Mbaye
 Agustin Ruiz

4 goals

 Benjamin
 Bartholomew Ibenegbu
 Yuri Krasheninnikov
 Ngalla Sylla
 Dejan Stankovic

Discipline

Cards issued

Player with most cards

Team with most cards

Referee who has issued most cards

 Yellow (38)
 Second yellow (2)
 Red (2)

 Hamed Ghorbanpour (3)
 Hassan Abdollahi (2)
 Khalid Al-Rajhi (2)
Rui Coimbra (2)
 Mohd Alhafes (2)

 (8)
 (5)
 (5)

 Javier Bentancor (7)
 Alexander Berezkin (6)
 Jose Cortez (5)
 Juan Rodriguez (5)

Final standings

References

External links
FIFA Beach Soccer World Cup Ravenna/Italy 2011 , FIFA.com
FIFA Beach Soccer World Cup Ravenna/Italy 2011, Beach Soccer Worldwide
FIFA Technical Report

 
2011
Beach Soccer World Cup
FIFA Beach Soccer World Cup
2011